French Creek Township is one of eighteen townships in Allamakee County, Iowa, USA.  At the 2010 census, its population was 225.

History
French Creek Township was organized in 1856. It is named for the creek flowing through it. French is the name of an early settler who lived near the head of French Creek.

Geography
According to the USGS, it contains two cemeteries: English Bench and French Creek Methodist.

References

External links
 US-Counties.com
 City-Data.com

Townships in Allamakee County, Iowa
Townships in Iowa
1856 establishments in Iowa
Populated places established in 1856